Waiting for You is a 2017 British mystery drama film directed by Charles Garrad, and co-written by Garrad and Hugh Stoddart and Charles Garrad. It stars Colin Morgan and Fanny Ardant with Audrey Bastien and Abdelkrim Bahloul featured in supporting roles.

Premise
Waiting for You is a coming-of-age feature that centres on Paul Ashton, played by Colin Morgan, who investigates his late father's increasingly disturbing past and becomes suspicious of the mysterious, melancholic and probably dangerous older woman, Madeleine, played by Fanny Ardant.

Cast

Main Cast
 Colin Morgan as Paul Ashton
A young man who goes to France to look for something he thinks is owed to his dead father.
 Fanny Ardant as Madeleine Brown
A mysterious, melancholic and probably dangerous older woman who is suspicious of Paul Ashton.

Supporting Cast
 Audrey Bastien as Sylvie
The lively daughter of a bar owner, she directs Paul Ashton to "Madame Brown's."
 Abdelkrim Bahloul as Ahmed
The Algerian retainer, who is doing his best to keep Madeleine Brown's house from falling.

Minor Cast
 Clare Holman as Janet
 Norah Lehembre as Celine 
 Bellamine Abdelmalek as Hassan 
 Fergus Craig as Dave 
 Vincent Jouan as Antoine 
 Sam Cox as Len 
 Jacky Nercessian as Archivist 
 Daniel Poyser as Tony 
 Fred Pearson as Fred
 Pamela Betsy Cooper as Mouner 
 Rachel Gill as Funeral Attender 
 Sona Vyas as Nurse
 Atlantik Bikliqi as Funeral Attender
 John Neville Family Member

Production

Development
Artist and Production designer Charles Garrad makes his feature directorial debut on the project, which he describes as "a lyrical mystery." The film, written by Hugh Stoddart and Charles Garrad, was designed by Ben Smith and shot by cinematographer David Raedeker.

Casting
On 1 June 2015, Colin Morgan and Fanny Ardant were announced to join the cast.

Filming
It was announced that Waiting for You started principal photography in France on 1 June 2015. The film, funded by private equity, did a shoot for five weeks on location in the Languedoc-Roussillon region of southern France until June 20. Production then moved to Ilford in the UK for a week. Filming ended on 25 June 2015.

References

External links
 
 
 Interview with Charles Garrad by Montse Bru

English-language films
2010s French-language films
2010s mystery drama films
British mystery drama films
French mystery drama films
2010s French films